Micro Planner X-Pert  (or X-Pert) is a project management software package in continuous development since 1979.

Overview 
X-Pert is geared to producing critical path method and PERT schedules for major, long-term projects (in one case a duration now approaching 40 years).

Developed by users and contributors to the ICL 1900 PERT mainframe package, X-Pert is one of the few packages still fully supporting the activity on arrow project network process.

X-Pert supports the full cycle of project management – through multi-level work breakdown structure creation, transition to multiple projects using critical path diagrams and Gantt chart presentation.

X-Pert is available as Software as a Service (SaaS) running in the cloud, for a low monthly subscription

History 
At its first commercial release in 1980, Micro Planner was the first project management package for a micro computer.

First developed for the Apple II series computer in 1979, versions have also existed at various times for the Apple ///, Sirius Systems Technology Victor, Macintosh, Silicon Graphics IRIX platforms, and currently for Microsoft Windows.

With the simultaneous release of Version 6 in 1988, for both Macintosh and Windows; Micro Planner became the first cross-platform project management solution for companies with a mixed hardware environment.

As of 2014 a 32-bit version for Windows and Mac OS X is under advanced development.

Specifications

See also
List of project management software
Earned value management
Program Evaluation and Review Technique

References

External links
 Micro Planning International Website
 Micro Planning UK Website
 Micro Planning International Asia Pacific Website

Project management software
Critical Path Scheduling